Christopher John Carpenter (born December 26, 1985) is an American former Major League Baseball (MLB) pitcher who played for the Chicago Cubs and Boston Red Sox in 2011 and 2012 and in Nippon Professional Baseball (NPB) for the Tokyo Yakult Swallows in 2014.

Amateur career
A native of Bryan, Ohio, Carpenter attended Bryan High School and Kent State University. In 2007, he played collegiate summer baseball with the Chatham A's of the Cape Cod Baseball League. In 2008, he was named the Mid-American Conference Baseball Pitcher of the Year. He was selected by the Cubs in the third round of the 2008 MLB Draft.

Professional career

Chicago Cubs
Carpenter was called up to the majors for the first time with the Chicago Cubs on June 14, 2011. He made his debut that day against the Milwaukee Brewers, pitching two-thirds of an inning with one strikeout.

Boston Red Sox
Carpenter was dealt to the Boston Red Sox on February 21, 2012, as compensation for the Cubs hiring then-Boston General Manager Theo Epstein.

Carpenter was designated for assignment on January 22, 2013, to the Pawtucket Red Sox to make room for newly signed Mike Napoli.

Personal
In 2013, Carpenter proposed to girlfriend, Sarah French on the Love Lock Bridge in Paris, France.  The two met while Carpenter was pitching for the Boston Red Sox and French was covering the Red Sox Centennial as a reporter.

References

External links

1985 births
Living people
Chicago Cubs players
Boston Red Sox players
Baseball players from Ohio
Major League Baseball pitchers
People from Bryan, Ohio
Kent State Golden Flashes baseball players
Chatham Anglers players
Arizona League Cubs players
Boise Hawks players
Peoria Chiefs players
Daytona Cubs players
Tennessee Smokies players
Iowa Cubs players
Gulf Coast Red Sox players
Greenville Drive players
Portland Sea Dogs players
Pawtucket Red Sox players
Mesa Solar Sox players
Louisville Bats players
Tokyo Yakult Swallows players
American expatriate baseball players in Japan
Nippon Professional Baseball pitchers